was a  after Manju and before Chōryaku. This period spanned the years from July 1028 through April 1037.

Change of era
 1028 : The new era name Chōgen was created to mark and event or series of events. The previous era ended and the new one commenced in Manju 5, on the 25th day of the 7th month.

Events of the Chōgen era
 Chōgen 9, on the 17th day of the 4th month (1036): In the 9th year of Emperor Go-Ichijō's reign (後一条天皇9年), he died; and the succession (senso) was received by his son.
 Chōgen 9, in the 7th month (1036): Emperor Go-Suzaku is said to have acceded to the throne (sokui).

Notes

References
 Brown, Delmer M. and Ichirō Ishida, eds. (1979).  Gukanshō: The Future and the Past. Berkeley: University of California Press. ;  OCLC 251325323
 Nussbaum, Louis-Frédéric and Käthe Roth. (2005).  Japan encyclopedia. Cambridge: Harvard University Press. ;  OCLC 58053128
 Titsingh, Isaac. (1834). Nihon Odai Ichiran; ou,  Annales des empereurs du Japon.  Paris: Royal Asiatic Society, Oriental Translation Fund of Great Britain and Ireland. OCLC 5850691
 Varley, H. Paul. (1980). A Chronicle of Gods and Sovereigns: Jinnō Shōtōki of Kitabatake Chikafusa. New York: Columbia University Press. ;  OCLC 6042764

External links
 National Diet Library, "The Japanese Calendar" -- historical overview plus illustrative images from library's collection

Japanese eras